Marius Paškevičius (born 31 October 1979) is a Lithuanian judoka.

Achievements

He achieved semi-finals in the heavyweight division at the 2015 European Judo Championships, which coincided with the 2015 European Games, losing to the eventual Gold medal winner Adam Okruashvili of Georgia.

On November 1, 2015, he competed in Grand Slam judo in Abu Dhabi, winning at least one round by ippon.

References

External links
 
 
 Judo videos of Marius Paškevičius in action (JudoVision.org)

1979 births
Living people
Lithuanian male judoka
Judoka at the 2000 Summer Olympics
Judoka at the 2012 Summer Olympics
Olympic judoka of Lithuania
Judoka at the 2015 European Games
European Games competitors for Lithuania